Tikkurilan Tiikerit is a Finnish floorball club from Vantaa. By licensed players, it is the fourth largest floorball club in Finland. It has 837 licensed players and over one thousand members.

Tikkurilan Tiikerit has a 2 women's floorball teams and 4 men's teams. Both men's and women's first teams play in regional series.

In addition to the men's and women's teams, the club also has 25 junior teams (20 boys, 5 girls).

2011-12 Roster

Women's

Honours
2004-05 Naisten Salibandyliiga champions

References

External links
Club Homepage 
 Floorball regional series 

Finnish floorball teams
Sport in Vantaa